The Hazara people are an ethnic group who are mostly from Afghanistan, primarily from the central regions of Afghanistan, known as Hazarajat, they established a large diaspora that consists of many communities in different countries around the world as part of the later Afghan diaspora. There are currently a million Hazara who live in the Balochistan province of Pakistan mostly in Quetta, many of whom have been settled in the country for generations and are now Pakistani citizens. A similarly large Hazara community is also present in Mashhad, Iran, as part of the Hazara and Afghan diaspora.

Apart from Pakistan and Iran, many Hazaras have migrated to Europe, and some to North America and Australia, mostly due to an unstable political and economic situation prevailing back home as well as the ongoing persecution of Hazaras in Afghanistan and Pakistan.

Overseas communities

Australia 

The Hazara Council of Australia is an organization formed by the Hazara community of Australia. Arman Monthly is a Persian-language magazine distributed nationwide which is published by the Hazara community. The 2003 Australian documentary film Molly & Mobarak is based on a Hazara asylum seeker who enters Australia, falls in love with a local girl and faces possible deportation as his temporary visa nears expiration.

India 

The Attarwala of India claim to be descended from a group of Mughal Hazara soldiers who were initially settled in Agra, during the rule of the Mughal Emperor Jahangir. According to their recorded documents, they then migrated to Ahmedabad via Gwalior, Ratlam and Godhra. This migration followed their participation of the community in the 1857 Indian War of Independence. Once settled in Gujarat, the community took up the occupation of manufacturing of perfumes known as ittars. The word attarwala means the manufacturer of perfumes. A second migration took place in 1947 from Agra, after the partition of India, with some members immigrating to Pakistan, while others joining their co-ethnics in Ahmedabad. The Attarwala are now found mainly in Ahmedabad, while those in Pakistan are found mainly in Karachi.

Indonesia 

The Hazaras in Indonesia are mostly victims of the conflict in Afghanistan who fled from ethnic and religious persecution by the Taliban. Some Hazaras in Indonesia only stop temporarily before seeking asylum in other countries such as Australia, Malaysia, and Singapore. The arrival of the Hazara in Indonesia initially came from Jakarta then many of them moved to the Puncak area and then some of them lived and settled and married with local peoples.

United States 
In the United States, there are reportedly 10,000 Hazaras mostly immigrating from Afghanistan and Pakistan. Some notable people from the community include Hassan Poladi, a writer and intellectual,, Mr. Capone-E a rapper. and Shakeeb Hamdard, the first winner of Afghan Star, a TV reality show on Tolo TV in Afghanistan. There is fairly a large group of Hazara immigrants living in the Washington D.C. metro area whose members founded an association called Hazara American Association.

See also 
 Hazaras in Europe
 Hazara Australians
 Hazara Indonesians
 Afghan Australians
 Pakistani Australians

References

 
Afghan diaspora
Pakistani diaspora